Clifford Wayne "Cliff" Trow (born July 27, 1929), was an American politician who was a member of the Oregon State Senate.

Trow was born in Topeka, Kansas. He was a history professor at Oregon State University, serving for 31 years.

References

1929 births
Living people
Democratic Party Oregon state senators
Politicians from Corvallis, Oregon
Politicians from Topeka, Kansas
Oregon State University faculty